SCB may refer to:

Organisations
 Saunders College of Business, a college at Rochester Institute of Technology in Rochester, New York, US
 Schola Cantorum Basiliensis, a music academy in Basel, Switzerland
 Secunderabad Cantonment Board, a civic authority of Secunderabad, India
 Securities Commission of the Bahamas
 Ship Characteristics Board, a US Navy body (1945 – c. 1970)
 Society for Conservation Biology, organization concerned with conserving biological diversity
 Solomon Cordwell Buenz, an international architecture firm based in Chicago, Illinois, US
 Southern Cross Broadcasting, an Australian television broadcaster
 Standing Council of the Baronetage, a British organization for baronets
 Statistics Sweden (Swedish: Statistiska centralbyrån "Central Statistics Bureau"), a Swedish government department

Banks
 Shanghai Commercial Bank, a commercial bank headquartered in Hong Kong
 Siam Commercial Bank, a commercial bank headquartered in Bangkok, Thailand
 Standard Chartered, a British bank headquartered in London

Sports
 SC Bern, a Swiss ice hockey team
 SC Bastia, soccer club in Bastia, France
 S.C. Braga, soccer club in Braga, Portugal
 Speedway Control Bureau or Speedway Control Board, a British motorcycle racing organization
 Stock Car Brasil, Brazilian motor racing series

Other uses

 Serbo-Croat-Bosnian, a South Slavic language
 Standard Colloquial Bengali, of the Bengali language
 Surat City Bus, bus service in Surat, Gujarat, India
 Survey of Current Business, a monthly publication of the US Bureau of Economic Analysis